Valley of the Giants is a Canadian post-rock supergroup composed of members from Broken Social Scene, Godspeed You! Black Emperor, Silver Mt. Zion, Do Make Say Think, Shalabi Effect and Strawberry. Stylistically, Valley of the Giants blends rock with elements of folk and  world music.

History
Valley of the Giants formed in Lanark Highlands, Ontario, Canada, in early 2002, and included instrumentalists Brendan Canning, Charles Spearin and Anthony Seck, singer Deirdre Smith, violinist Sophie Trudeau and Raoul Tangeuy. In 2004, the band released an album, Valley of the Giants: Westworld. which received relatively positive reviews.  The album was produced by Seck and mixed by John Dooher.

Members 
Brendan Canning (Broken Social Scene, hHead)
Charles Spearin (Broken Social Scene, Do Make Say Think)
Deirdre Smith (Strawberry)
Anthony Seck (Shalabi Effect)
Sophie Trudeau (Thee Silver Mt. Zion Memorial Orchestra & Tra-La-La Band, Godspeed You! Black Emperor)
Raoul Tangeuy

Discography 
Valley of the Giants (CD, 2004)

References

External links
Valley of the Giants official website

Canadian post-rock groups
Rock music supergroups
Arts & Crafts Productions artists
Musical groups established in 2002
2002 establishments in Ontario